Veronika Morávková (born January 22, 1983 in Pardubice) is a Czech ice dancer. She is the 2002 and 2003 Czech champion with partner Jiří Procházka.

Competitive highlights 
(with Procházka)

References 
 

Czech female ice dancers
1983 births
Living people
Sportspeople from Pardubice